Philenora irregularis is a moth in the subfamily Arctiinae. It was described by Thomas Pennington Lucas in 1890. It is found in Australia.

References

Moths described in 1890
Lithosiini